Tiber is a side platformed Sacramento RT light rail station in La Riviera, California, United States. The station was opened on September 5, 1987, and is operated by the Sacramento Regional Transit District. It is served by the Gold Line. The station is located just west of Tiber Drive on Folsom Boulevard, north of Highway 50.

Platforms and tracks

References

Sacramento Regional Transit light rail stations
Railway stations in the United States opened in 1987